El hijo pródigo may refer to:

Books
El hijo pródigo, Mexican literary review edited by Alí Chumacero 
El hijo pródigo,(also known as Auto sacramental del hijo pródigo) religious play Juan de Espinosa Medrano
partida del hijo pródigo / regreso del hijo pródigo 1807 Carlos Baguer

Film and TV
El hijo pródigo, 1969 Mexican film directed by Servando González with Libertad Lamarque 
El hijo pródigo, 2013 film Cinema of Chile

Music
El hijo pródigo, 1976 ballet by Federico Moreno Torroba
El hijo pródigo, album by Avalanch 2005